Rester Peak is a peak rising to   northeast of Mount Rücker in the Royal Society Range. It is named after A. Carl Rester, astrophysicist, Institute for Astrophysics and Planetary Exploration, University of Florida. He was responsible for the instrumentation of a huge astrophysical observation balloon that was launched over Antarctica in 1988. 

Mountains of Victoria Land
Scott Coast